Lois Rodden (22 May 1928 - 5 June 2003) was an astrologer, astrological data collector and founder of Astrodatabank. She was a pioneer in raising awareness of the sourcing of data being foundational in the credibility of astrology.

Early life
Lois was born Lois Mae Fast on May 22, 1928 at 12:22 am MST (rectified by her) in Lang, Saskatchewan, Canada.

Rodden's study of astrology with the Church of Light, began in 1962 when she moved to Los Angeles.

Career
She sold her first astrology article in February, 1968, and in September, 1968, was invited to become a charter member of Professional Astrologers Inc. At the same time, she was invited to give a series of astrology lectures in San Jose and to teach at the Hollywood Astrological Society. She believed that her career as an astrologer began at that time.

Beginning around 1973, she built up a clientele mainly of people in the entertainment industry, keeping to practical rather than psychological concerns in the client's charts. In 1976 she wrote a list of transit definitions for one of the first computer companies to sell monthly forecasts. She also wrote Sun signs for the astrology scrolls that sell from vending machines, annual sun sign books for checkout stands and astrologically-based advertising copy.

In 1985 Rodden moved to a less urban part of California to concentrate more on research than clients. She first went to Europe in 1990. Lois was an active member of Inland Empire Mensa.

Publications
In addition to being editor/publisher of the long-running journal, Data News Rodden wrote five books of astrological data (the Astro-Data series), and three textbooks, The Mercury Method of Chart Comparison; Modern Transits, and Money, How to Find it With Astrology.

Of her publication, she said  (Data News, August 2001)

Astro-Databank and the Rodden Rating System

Rodden was best known for avidly collecting exact data of births and times of public figures and celebrities. Lois Rodden applied her rating system to all the older US data she had collected. This came from astrological organizations – like The Church of Light – data collections – like Sabian Symbols– and the astrological magazines that were very popular during the 1930s and 1940s. It was a huge task. She collected thousands of data over many years that revealed just how undisciplined the astrological community was in the first half of the 20th-century.

She emphasised the importance of calculating charts using time zones, time signatures, longitudes and latitude, deploring the tendency of many astrologers to use inaccurate or non-sourced information as an easy alternative to proper research.

Rodden had high standards - she believed in a kind of public responsibility for the astrologer to choose "clean " (accurate) data over the flawed type ("dirty"). She constantly lobbied publishers, editors and fellow astrologers to make them aware of her concerns. Over 40 years she amassed tens of thousands of data, both private and public, and called her business Astro-Databank. She would sell a birth record to anyone who wanted it for $5 over the phone.

After meeting computer programmer Mark McDonough, they developed her data collection of astrological details on thousands of notable people into an online resource, now offered for free. The repository is a tool for astrologers to formulate accurate birth charts for distribution, reference, study and research.

Rodden rating system 

The Rodden Rating system is used for astrology articles.

Lois Rodden requested other astrologers and astrological data collectors to explain their various data collection with a plea:  - from her book (Profiles of Women)

The practice, which was quickly adopted, represents an important, positive development in astrology's chequered history.

In 2009, after being sold to the Swiss company Astrodienst A.G., Astro-Databank was converted into read only wiki format and is now a freely accessible Internet resource available here Astro-Databank, and strictly practices the basic guidelines of Rodden Rating.

Books
Mercury Method of Chart Comparison. American Federation of Astrologers Inc., 1973   
Modern Transits. American Federation of Astrologers Inc., 1978  
Astro-Data I: Profiles of Women. (mit Betsy Rodden) Data Newz Revised edition, 1996   
Astro-Data II: American Book of Charts. 445 pages. American Federation of Astrologers Inc; Revised edition 1984   
Astro-Data III: Occult/ General Collection. American Federation of Astrologers Inc., 1986, 1992. 265 Pages.   
Astro-Data IV: Culture Collection. American Federation of Astrologers Inc., 1992   
Astro-Data V: Profiles of Crime. Data Newz, 1992 
Money: How to Find It With Astrology. 280 Pages. Data Newz 1998. American Federation of Astrologers 2006

Awards
1992, UAC Regulus Award for Enhancing Astrology's Image. 
2002 UAC Award for Lifetime Achievement

Personal life
Lois married George Rodden, an aircraft engineer and part-time musician, they had six children, one deceased. These were Amy, Baby, Betsy, Dana, Jon and Lynn Rodden. The family lived in the San Francisco Bay area for ten years before settling in the Los Angeles area where George Rodden worked for Ford Marketing Corporation and conducted youth symphonies as an avocation. In 1968, they separated, divorcing the following year.

Death
Rodden died on June 5, 2003 at 8.30 am PDT, in Yucaipa, California.

References

External links
 https://web.archive.org/web/20060715210347/http://koti.mbnet.fi/neptunia/astrology/rodden1.htm
 http://www.astrolodge.co.uk/  (memorial)
 https://web.archive.org/web/20061111065330/http://www.solsticepoint.com/astrologersmemorial/rodden.html  (memorial)
 http://www.astrodatabank.com now automatically redirected to Astro-Databank

1928 births
2003 deaths
20th-century astrologers
21st-century astrologers
American astrologers
Canadian astrologers
People from Los Angeles
Mensans
Astrological data collectors